The 25th season of Taniec z gwiazdami, the Polish edition of Dancing with the Stars, will start on 30 August 2021. This will be the twelfth season aired on Polsat. For the first time show will be aired on Mondays. Krzysztof Ibisz, Paulina Sykut-Jeżyna and new presenter Izabela Janachowska will be the hosts. Iwona Pavlović, Michał Malitowski and Andrzej Grabowski will return as judges, Andrzej Piaseczny will join as the fourth judge.

Couples

Scores

Red numbers indicate the lowest score for each week.
Green numbers indicate the highest score for each week.
 indicates the couple eliminated that week.
 indicates the returning couple that finished in the bottom two or three.
 indicates the couple saved from elimination by immunity.
 indicates the winning couple.
 indicates the runner-up.
 indicates the couple in third place.
 indicates the couple withdrew from the competition.

Average score chart 
This table only counts for dances scored on a 40-points scale.

Highest and lowest scoring performances 
The best and worst performances in each dance according to the judges' 40-point scale:

Couples' highest and lowest scoring dances

According to the 40-point scale:

Weekly scores
Unless indicated otherwise, individual judges scores in the charts below (given in parentheses) are listed in this order from left to right: Andrzej Piaseczny, Iwona Pavlović, Michał Malitowski and Andrzej Grabowski.

Week 1: Season Premiere

Running order

Week 2: Love Night

Running order

Week 3: Hometown Glory

Running order

Week 4: You Decide!

Couples performed one unlearned dance to music selected by the general public on social media.

Running order

Week 5: Trio Challenge

Running order

Week 6: ABBA Week

Running order

Week 7: Around the World

Running order

Week 8: Trio Challenge (Semi-final)
Running order

Dance-off

Running order

Week 9: Season Final

Running order

Other Dances

Dance chart
The celebrities and professional partners danced one of these routines for each corresponding week:
Week 1 (Season Premiere): Quickstep, Waltz, Jive, Cha-cha-cha, Tango, Samba, Viennese Waltz
Week 2 (Love Night): One unlearned dance (introducing Rumba)
Week 3 (Hometown Glory): One unlearned dance (introducing Foxtrot) and Mambo Marathon
Week 4 (You Decide!): One unlearned dance (introducing Contemporary) and Team Dance (Salsa and Charleston)
Week 5 (Trio Challenge): One unlearned dance (introducing Charleston) and dance-offs 
Week 6 (ABBA Week): One unlearned dance (introducing Swing, Paso Doble) and one repeated dance
Week 7 (Around the World): One unlearned uncommon dance (Hip-hop, Salsa, Disco, Bollywood) and one repeated dance
Week 8 (Semi-final: Trio Challenge): One unlearned dance, one repeated dance (Judges' choice) and dance-offs
Week 9 (Season Final): One unlearned dance, one repeated dance (rivals' choice) and Freestyle

 Highest scoring dance
 Lowest scoring dance
 Performed, but not scored
 Bonus points
 Not performed due to withdrawal
 Gained bonus points for winning this dance-off
 Gained no bonus points for losing this dance-off

Guest performances

References

Season 25
2021 Polish television seasons